Villalbilla de Gumiel is a municipality located in the province of Burgos, Castile and León, Spain. According to the 2001 census (INE), the municipality has a population of 127 inhabitants.

References

Municipalities in the Province of Burgos